Cruiserweight, also referred to as junior heavyweight, is a weight class in professional boxing between light heavyweight and heavyweight. Before the advent of the current cruiserweight class, "light heavyweight" and "cruiserweight" were sometimes used interchangeably in the United Kingdom.

Professional boxing
The division was established in order to accommodate smaller heavyweight boxers who could not compete with the growing size of boxers in that division. While many great heavyweight champions (such as Rocky Marciano and Joe Louis) weighed around 190 pounds in their career, during the 1970s it became fairly standard that fit heavyweight boxers weighed at least .

The WBC was the first boxing organization to recognize the cruiserweight division when it sanctioned a bout between Marvin Camel and Mate Parlov on December 8, 1979, for their version of the title. That fight was a draw, but in the rematch in March 1980 Camel won and became the first cruiserweight champion. In 1982 the World Boxing Association recognized Ossie Ocasio as their first cruiserweight champion when he defeated South African Robbie Williams (although at that time the WBA called the division "junior heavyweight"). The International Boxing Federation followed suit in 1983 when it matched former WBC champion Marvin Camel against Rick Sekorski for their inaugural title. Camel won and became the first IBF cruiserweight champion.

Several boxers moved up to heavyweight after winning world titles at cruiserweight. Evander Holyfield unified the WBA, WBC, and IBF titles to become undisputed champion, the first to do so, and then moved up to the heavyweight division in 1988. In 2006, the second man to become undisputed champion was O’Neil Bell, who was later stripped of the IBF title.

Other notable champions in the division have been Bobby Czyz, Dwight Muhammad Qawi, Tomasz Adamek, Virgil Hill, Al Cole, Orlin Norris, James Toney, David Haye, Tony Bellew and Oleksandr Usyk.

Current world champions

Current world rankings

The Ring

Keys:
 Current The Ring world champion

BoxRec

Longest reigning world cruiserweight champions
Below is a list of longest reigning cruiserweight champions in boxing measured by the individual's longest reign. Career total time as champion (for multiple time champions) does not apply.

 Active reign
 Reign has ended

Kickboxing

In kickboxing, a cruiserweight fighter generally weighs between 82 kg (181 lb) and 88 kg (195 lb). However, some governing bodies have slightly different classes. The International Kickboxing Federation (IKF) Cruiserweight (professional and amateur) division is 186.1 lb–195 lb or 84.6 kg–88.6 kg.

Bare-knuckle boxing
The limit of cruiserweight generally differs among promotions in bare-knuckle boxing: 

References 

Boxing weight classes
Kickboxing weight classes